The Gagarin Cup is the trophy presented to the winner of the Kontinental Hockey League (KHL) playoffs, and is named after Soviet cosmonaut Yuri Gagarin, the first human in space. The Cup was supposedly named after Gagarin because the last possible game of the inaugural KHL season would take place on April 12, the anniversary date of Gagarin's flight.

After the end of the KHL's regular season, sixteen teams participate in the playoffs. The 1/8 and quarter-finals were a best-of-five series during the first season, and the semi-finals and finals were a best-of-seven series during the first season. Conferences were established for the second season. Conference quarter-finals are a best-of-five series while the conference semi-finals, conference finals and Gagarin Cup finals are a best-of-seven series. The winner of the final best-of-seven series receives the Gagarin Cup. It has been reported that the Cup weighs 18 kg (40 lbs), making it heavier than the NHL's Stanley Cup.

Naming history
According to league president Alexander Medvedev, the Cup was named after Yuri Gagarin because Russian citizens associate his name with the achievement of great accomplishments, and the man himself has been described as a symbol of the nation.

Series results

Appearances
In the table, the teams are sorted by the number of appearances in the Gagarin Cup finals, then by the number of wins.  Italicized marks now non-existent (not playing in the KHL) teams. In the "Years of appearance" column, bold years indicate winning Gagarin Cup Finals appearances.

References

 
Monuments and memorials to Yuri Gagarin
Kontinental Hockey League trophies and awards
Sports trophies and awards
Awards established in 2008
Russian ice hockey trophies and awards
2008 establishments in Russia